Eloy is a city in Pinal County, Arizona, United States, approximately  northwest of Tucson and about  southeast of Phoenix. According to the U.S. Census estimates in 2019, the population of the city is 19,625.

History 
In 1880, as tracks were being laid for the Southern Pacific Railroad, a small number of boxcars were used as a camp for railroad workers. It was discovered that cotton could be grown in the area's climate. In 1902, the Southern Pacific Railroad named the area train stop Eloy, an acronym for East Line Of Yuma. Alternately, there is a legend that the area was initially called Eloi, after a railroad employee looked around at the barren desert and said, "Eloi, Eloi, lama sabachthani?" (Aramaic and Hebrew for "My God, my God, why hast thou forsaken me?"). A town called Cotton City was established in 1918, but in 1919 the newly established post office rejected that name in favor of Eloy. As part of Pinal County, the city incorporated in 1949.

Geography
According to the city of Eloy, the city has a total area of 113.7 square miles (294.5 km), all  land.

Demographics

As of the census of 2011, there were 16,964 people, 2,492 households, and 1,988 families residing in Eloy. The racial makeup of the city was 58% Hispanic or Latino, 5% Black or African American, 41% White, 4% Native American, 1% Asian, <1% Pacific Islander, 31% from other races, and 5% from two or more races.

There were 2,492 households, out of which 50.1% had children under the age of 18 living with them, 49.4% were married couples living together, 21.9% had a female householder with no husband present, and 20.2% were non-families. 15.5% of all households were made up of individuals, and 6.3% had someone living alone who was 65 years of age or older.  The average household size was 3.57 and the average family size was 3.94.

In the city, the population was spread out, with 33.7% under the age of 18, 12.0% from 18 to 24, 32.5% from 25 to 44, 15.4% from 45 to 64, and 6.4% who were 65 years of age or older.  The median age was 28 years. For every 100 females, there were 137.1 males.  For every 100 females age 18 and over, there were 154.8 males.

The median income for a household in the city was $26,518, and the median income for a family was $28,494. Males had a median income of $25,295 versus $21,088 for females. The per capita income for the city was $9,194.  About 27.9% of families and 31.9% of the population were below the poverty line, including 35.6% of those under age 18 and 24.6% of those age 65 or over.

Government
The mayor of Eloy is Micah Powell, whose term runs from 2020 to 2022. He was previously vice mayor for three terms, starting in 2014. The vice mayor is Andrew Rodriguez, whose term is from 2018 to 2022. The city council consists of the mayor, who serves a two-year term, and six city council members, who each serve four-year terms.

Economy
The largest employer is CoreCivic and those CoreCivic prisoners are included in the census. CoreCivic operates four facilities: Eloy Detention Center (opened 1994), Red Rock Correctional Center (opened 2006), Saguaro Correctional Center (opened 2007), and La Palma Correctional Facility (opened 2008). As of 2020 the CoreCivic-operated correctional centers house detainees from states including Hawaii, Nevada, Idaho, and Kansas.

According to Eloy's 2019 Comprehensive Annual Financial Report, the top employers in the city are:

Transportation
The closest major airports to Eloy are Phoenix Sky Harbor International Airport and Tucson International Airport. Casa Grande Shuttle provides an airport shuttle to Sky Harbor.

The Eloy Municipal Airport is a non-towered airport located in Eloy.

Greyhound serves Eloy.

Culture
Eloy is also home to the world's largest skydive dropzone, operated by Skydive Arizona, and bills itself as the skydiving capital of the world. Two parachute manufacturers are in Eloy: Firebird USA and Sun Path Products.

The city has an 18-hole, par-72 golf course, Robson Ranch Golf Club. The Casa Grande Valley Historical Society & Museum was founded in 1964 and holds a collection of more than 50,000 artifacts. Picacho Peak State Park is located 10 miles southeast of Eloy. It is the site of the only Civil War battle in Arizona; the battle is re-enacted annually.

Education

The Eloy Elementary School District provides elementary education in grades kindergarten through 8 through its four schools:
 Curiel Primary School (grades kindergarten through 3)
 Eloy Intermediate School (grades 4 through 6)
 Eloy Junior High School (grades 7 and 8)
 Toltec Elementary School (grades 4 through 8)

Eloy has one public high school, Santa Cruz Valley Union High School, and some residents attend nearby Casa Grande Union High School.

Notable people
 Mossy Cade – former professional football player
 Anna Maria Chávez – former CEO of Girl Scouts of the USA
 Levi Jones – former professional football player
 Art Malone – former professional football player
 Benny Malone – former professional football player
 Ricky Nelson – former professional baseball player
 Paul Powell – former professional baseball player
 Jeff Provenzano – professional skydiver

References

External links

 
 Eloy City Limits

 
Cities in Arizona
Cities in Pinal County, Arizona
Phoenix metropolitan area